Puvvada Ajay Kumar is an Indian Politician serving as the current Transport Minister of Telangana since 2019. He is also the chairman of Mamata Academy of Medical Sciences, Hyderabad, and Mamata Medical, Nursing and Dental colleges in Khammam. He was elected as Member of Legislative Assembly from Khammam constituency. Later, he joined in Telangana Rastra Samiti.

Career 
Initially, his political career started as Central Executive Council member of the YSR Congress Party. Later, he contested as Member of Legislative Assembly from Indian National Congress party and elected to Legislative Assembly of Telangana in General Elections 2014. Finally in 2016, he quit Indian National Congress Party and joined in Telangana Rastra Samithi.
In 2019 he was appointed as the Minister of Transport of Telangana.

References

External links 
 Khammam Assembly Election Results 2014 Empowering India.

Living people
Telangana Rashtra Samithi politicians
Telangana MLAs 2014–2018
1965 births
Telangana MLAs 2018–2023